The Foton Saga is a 5-seater compact SUV produced by Foton Motor that later spawned a pickup version called the Foton SUP or Foton Sapu (萨普).

Overview
The overall styling of the facelifted Foton Saga resembles the second generation Honda CR-V by the general public except for the front fascia. Apart from the self-developed front fascia and significantly larger dimensions, the entire side and rear end of the vehicle is heavily inspired by the Honda compact crossover.

The Foton Saga was sold from 2003 to 2010 and was replaced by the Foton Tunland shortly after due to slow sales, leaving the Foton SUP pickup being the only remaining body style available. Prices of the Foton SUP ranges from 50,880 to 90,985 yuan. 

The Foton SUP received a few facelifts through the years, with the latest ones only updating the grilles.

Powertrain
As of 2021, the Foton Saga pickup is only offered with a 1.5-litre inline-4 engine producing 116hp and 150Nm.

References

External links

Foton SUP Official Website 

Foton Motor vehicles
Compact sport utility vehicles
Pickup trucks
Cars of China

Cars introduced in 2003
2010s cars